CG-1 (Carretera General 1) is a road of the Andorra Road Network that connects the capital, Andorra la Vella with La Seu d'Urgell to Alt Urgell. The workers of FHASA contributed to its construction. It is also called Carretera d'Espanya.

References

Roads in Andorra